Declan Feenan (born 1980) is a playwright from Northern Ireland. His plays have been produced in Belfast, London, Edinburgh, Dublin, Raleigh, North Carolina, and New York City.

List of plays
 Limbo
 Catherine Medbh
 St Petersburg

Short films
 99,100

References

External links 
 https://web.archive.org/web/20110726065720/http://www.theagency.co.uk/clients/clientdisplay.html?viewListing=MzE2
 https://web.archive.org/web/20110720000140/http://www.nickhernbooks.co.uk/index.cfm?nid=authors&AuthorID=1233&alphabet=&isbn=9781848420335
 http://www.indyweek.com/indyweek/a-teenage-girl-on-the-brink-in-burning-coals-limbo/Content?oid=1330517
 https://www.imdb.com/name/nm2551525/

Living people
1980 births
Irish dramatists and playwrights
Irish male dramatists and playwrights